Michael Emerson (born September 7, 1954) is an American actor who is best known for his roles as serial killer William Hinks on The Practice, Benjamin Linus on Lost, Zep Hindle in the first Saw film, Cayden James on Arrow, and Harold Finch in the CBS series Person of Interest. Emerson has also worked extensively in theater and narration. He has won two Primetime Emmy Awards and been nominated for three others, as well as receiving other awards and nominations. He currently stars as Dr. Leland Townsend in the Paramount+ thriller series Evil.

Early life
Emerson was born in Cedar Rapids, Iowa, to Carol (née Hansen) and Ronald H. Emerson. He grew up in Toledo, Iowa, where he was a member of his high school marching band.

He graduated in 1976 from Drake University in Des Moines, Iowa, where he majored in theater and minored in art. He studied for a semester at the National Theater Institute at The Eugene O'Neill Theater Center, then moved to New York City. Unable to find acting work, he took retail jobs and worked as an illustrator. In 1986, he moved to Jacksonville, Florida, where (from 1986–93) he appeared in local productions at Theater Jacksonville and The Players by the Sea and worked as a director and teacher at Flagler College. After several years of work including illustration and teaching, Emerson earned a Master of Fine Arts degree at the University of Alabama in the Alabama Shakespeare Festival acting program.

Career
Emerson landed a starring role in 1997 as Oscar Wilde in Moises Kaufman's critically acclaimed off-Broadway play Gross Indecency: The Three Trials of Oscar Wilde, and then followed up with several other notable stage performances. In 1998, he performed opposite Uma Thurman in an off-Broadway production of Le Misanthrope. In 1999, he played Willie Oban in The Iceman Cometh. He co-starred with Kate Burton in both Give Me Your Answer, Do! and Hedda Gabler.

In September 2001, Emerson won an Emmy Award as Outstanding Guest Actor in a Drama Series for playing serial killer William Hinks in several episodes of The Practice. In 2006, Emerson began a guest-star role as Benjamin Linus on the serial drama television series Lost. Emerson was originally set to appear in a small number of episodes, then returned for Season 3 as a main cast member and eventually became a main antagonist of the program. He received an Emmy Award nomination in the Outstanding Supporting Actor category in 2007 and 2008 for his work in the third and fourth seasons. He won the award in 2009 after being nominated for his role in the fifth season.

Emerson was nominated in 2009 for a Golden Globe Award in the Best Performance by an Actor in a Supporting Role category. He was nominated for an Emmy for each season in which he was listed in the main cast.

On July 31, 2010, Emerson and Preston read A.R. Gurney's Love Letters, which was a 1990 finalist for the Pulitzer Prize for Drama, at the Charleston Stage as a fundraiser for the theater.

Emerson was set to reunite with former Lost cast member and friend Terry O'Quinn in a comedy-drama, tentatively titled Odd Jobs, by J. J. Abrams. It was expected to start filming by the end of 2010, but further development of the show has been postponed. Emerson joined the cast of another Abrams series, Person of Interest, that debuted in September 2011 on CBS. He played a billionaire who teams up with a supposedly dead CIA agent to fight crime in New York City.

Personal life 
Emerson married actress Carrie Preston in 1998 in her hometown of Macon, Georgia. They met while he was performing in a stage production of Hamlet in Alabama. It is his second marriage. The two later starred together in Straight-Jacket (2004).  Preston portrayed Emily Linus (the mother of Emerson's character) on Lost in the flashback sequences of the episode "The Man Behind the Curtain". The two teamed up again, with Emerson portraying Preston's next-door neighbor, in the film Ready? OK! (2008). Preston also appeared in several episodes of Person of Interest as Grace Hendricks (the former fiancée of Emerson's character).

Emerson supports charities connected to the theater community, including the Actors Fund, Broadway Cares, and Off-Off Broadway, in addition to publicly supported radio stations and Habitat for Humanity.

Filmography

Film

Television

Video games

Theater
 Othello, University of North Florida
 Noises Off (as Garry), Theatre Jacksonville, 1986 or 1987
 Hamlet (as Hamlet), University of North Florida Theatre, Jacksonville, Florida, 1987
 Hamlet (as Hamlet), Players-By-The-Sea Theatre, Jacksonville Beach, Florida
 The Importance of Being Earnest, Arkansas Repertory Theatre, 1990
 Parts Unknown, Players-By-The-Sea Theatre, Jacksonville Beach, Florida, 1993
 The Tempest (as Ferdinand), Alabama Shakespeare Festival, 1994 or 1995
 The Way of the World (as Lady Wishfort), Alabama Shakespeare Festival, 1994 or 1995
 Hamlet (as Rosencrantz), Alabama Shakespeare Festival, 1994 or 1995
 All's Well That Ends Well, Alabama Shakespeare Festival, 1994 or 1995
 Henry IV, Part 1, Alabama Shakespeare Festival, 1994 or 1995
 A Christmas Carol, Alabama Shakespeare Festival, 1994 or 1995
 The Crucible, Alabama Shakespeare Festival, 1994 or 1995
 Androcles and the Lion, Alabama Shakespeare Festival, 1995 or 1996
 Gross Indecency: The Trials of Oscar Wilde (as Oscar Wilde), Minetta Lane Theatre, off-Broadway, 1997–1998
 The Iceman Cometh (as Willie Oban), Brooks Atkinson Theatre, 1999
 Give Me Your Answer, Do! (as David Knight), Gramercy Theatre, off-Broadway, 1999–2000
 Hedda Gabler (as George Tesman), Williamstown Theatre Festival, Main Stage, 2000
 Hedda Gabler (as George Tesman), Ambassador Theatre, Broadway, 2001–2002
 Tartuffe (as Cleante), American Airlines Theatre, Broadway, 2003
 Measure for Measure (as Duke Vincentio), California Shakespeare Theater, Orinda, California, 2003
 Someone Who'll Watch Over Me, The Ridgefield Playhouse for Movies and the Performing Arts, 2004
 Hamlet (as Ghost, Claudius, Osric, and Guildenstern), McCarter Theatre Center, Princeton, New Jersey, 2005
 Bach at Leipzig (as Schott), New York Theatre Workshop, 2005
 Likeness, Primary Stages Theater (307 W. 38th Street), 2008
 Every Good Boy Deserves Favour (as Alexander), Chautauqua Theater Company, 2008
 Love Letters (as Andrew Makepeace Ladd, III), Charleston Stage, 2010
  Wakey, Wakey (play by Will Eno) Signature Theatre (as Guy), 2017

Other work
 In 2000, played the unnamed narrator character in the radio play adaptation of the Neil Gaiman short story, Murder Mysteries.
 In 2001, participated in a Woody Allen short called "Sounds From a Town I Love" which aired on television during The Concert for New York City and depicts people talking on their cellphones as they walk around New York City.
 In 2003, participated in a staged reading of a play involving string theory written by Jacquelyn Reingold called String Fever at Rockefeller University.
 In 2003, was the voice of George Washington in Favorite Son, an experimental documentary film about the relationship between George Washington and Alexander Hamilton.
 In 2005, narrated audio book CD of Robert Penn Warren's novel All the King's Men.
 In 2006, narrated audio book CD of The Amalgamation Polka by Stephen Wright, published.
 In 2007, with other Lost cast members, he participated in a play-reading session at the Tenney Theatre in Hawaii to raise money for the Honolulu Theatre for Youth.
 In 2009, narrated a reading of "Babar the Elephant" with the Honolulu Symphony Orchestra.
 Co-narrated with Peter J. Fernandez, the audio book version of James Patterson's novel, Four Blind Mice.
 Co-narrated with John Rubinstein the audio book of the novel Private Sector by Brian Haig.

Awards
Primetime Emmy Awards:
 Won - 53rd Primetime Emmy Awards (Outstanding Guest Actor in a Drama Series) for playing "William Hinks" on The Practice, 2001.
 Nominated - 59th Primetime Emmy Awards (Outstanding Supporting Actor in a Drama Series) for portraying Ben Linus on Lost, 2007.
 Nominated - 60th Primetime Emmy Awards (Outstanding Supporting Actor in a Drama Series) for portraying Ben Linus on Lost, 2008.
 Won - 61st Primetime Emmy Awards (Outstanding Supporting Actor in a Drama Series) for portraying Ben Linus on Lost, 2009.
 Nominated - 62nd Primetime Emmy Awards (Outstanding Supporting Actor in a Drama Series) for portraying Ben Linus on Lost, 2010.

Golden Globe Awards:
 Nominated - 67th Golden Globe Awards (Best Performance by an Actor in a Supporting Role in a Series, Mini-Series or Motion Picture Made for Television) for portraying Ben Linus on LOST, 2010.

Saturn Awards:
 Won - 34th Saturn Awards (Best Supporting Television Actor) for portraying Ben Linus on Lost, 2008.
 Nominated - 35th Saturn Awards (Best Supporting Television Actor) for portraying Ben Linus on Lost, 2009.
 Nominated - 36th Saturn Awards (Best Supporting Television Actor) for portraying Ben Linus on Lost, 2010.
 Nominated - 37th Saturn Awards (Best Supporting Television Actor) for portraying Ben Linus on Lost, 2011.

References

External links

 
 
 
 
 Meet Michael Emerson; an unofficial fansite; accessed December 2, 2014.
 Errico, Mike (October 2006). "Michael Emerson: 'I've always liked playing ambiguity.'". Blender. 
 Chattman, Jon (May 3, 2010). "Michael Emerson Reflects on Lost , Looks Ahead to the Finale". HuffPost.

1954 births
20th-century American male actors
21st-century American male actors
American male film actors
American male stage actors
American male Shakespearean actors
American male television actors
Audiobook narrators
Drake University alumni
Outstanding Performance by a Supporting Actor in a Drama Series Primetime Emmy Award winners
Living people
Male actors from Iowa
Actors from Cedar Rapids, Iowa
People from Toledo, Iowa